The archdeacons in the Church of Ireland are senior Anglican clergy who serve under their dioceses' bishops, usually with responsibility for the area's church buildings and pastoral care for clergy.

Archdeacons

Notes

Retirements

References

List
Lists of Anglicans
archdeacons in the Church of Ireland